The North Brentwood Historic District, is a national historic district located in the town of North Brentwood, Prince George's County, Maryland.  It was the earliest incorporated African American community in the county.  The historic district comprises 128 buildings reflecting its development over the period from 1891 to 1950. All of the early vernacular dwellings were of wood-frame construction with Late Victorian inspiration.  The 1920s house forms represented included bungalows, multi-family houses, and larger Foursquares. Small brick cottages were primarily built in the period immediately following World War II. The surviving historic buildings illustrate the forms and styles of buildings typically constructed in working-class suburban communities of the period.

It was listed on the National Register of Historic Places in 2003.

References

External links
, including photo in 2003, at Maryland Historical Trust website
Boundary Map of the North Brentwood Historic District, Prince George's County, at Maryland Historical Trust

African-American history of Prince George's County, Maryland
Historic districts in Prince George's County, Maryland
Houses in Prince George's County, Maryland
Houses on the National Register of Historic Places in Maryland
Victorian architecture in Maryland
Historic districts on the National Register of Historic Places in Maryland
Working-class culture in Maryland
National Register of Historic Places in Prince George's County, Maryland